Clash of the Titans is a British–American fantasy action film franchise based on characters and myths of Ancient Greek mythology. The 1981 feature film Clash of the Titans was remade in 2010, spawning the 2012 sequel Wrath of the Titans. Following an initial announcement, the subsequent sequel Revenge of the Titans went undeveloped.

Films 
The series originates with Clash of the Titans in 1981. A concept for a sequel was proposed to MGM in 1984, but Force of the Trojans was never produced.

The success of the 2010 Clash of the Titans remake prompted the sequel Wrath of the Titans. While Wrath of the Titans was still in post-production in November 2011, Warner Bros. hired Dan Mazeau and David Leslie Johnson to write a treatment for a third installment, Revenge of the Titans. By the spring of 2013 Sam Worthington said a third film was unlikely.

Characters

Crew

Other media

Video game 

In 2010, a video game based on the 2010 film was released for Xbox 360 and PlayStation 3 on July 27, 2010. The video game received negative reviews.

Comics 

Bluewater Productions started the four-part spin-off comic book series Wrath of the Titans in 2007. Set five years after the events of the 1981 film, Calibos escapes the underworld to take revenge against Perseus. A one-shot sequel titled Wrath of the Titans: Cyclops was released in 2009. Revenge of the Medusa was released as a four-part series in 2011.

Reception

Box office performance

Critical and public reaction

References

Film series introduced in 1981
Films based on classical mythology
Fantasy film series
Action film series
Adventure film series